The following is a partial list of the "G" codes for Medical Subject Headings (MeSH), as defined by the United States National Library of Medicine (NLM).

This list continues the information at List of MeSH codes (G05). Codes following these are found at List of MeSH codes (G07). For other MeSH codes, see List of MeSH codes.

The source for this content is the set of 2006 MeSH Trees from the NLM.

– biochemical phenomena, metabolism, and nutrition

– biochemical phenomena

– acid-base equilibrium

– aerobiosis

– allosteric regulation

– amino acid substitution

– anaerobiosis

– base composition

– binding sites
  – allosteric site
  – bay region (chemistry)
  – binding, competitive
  – binding sites, antibody

– body composition
  – body fat distribution
  – adiposity
  – body fluid compartments

– brain chemistry

– calcification, physiologic
  – tooth calcification

– diffusion

– down-regulation

– energy transfer
  – linear energy transfer

– enzyme activation

– enzyme stability

– fermentation

– ion transport
  – calcium signaling

– membrane fluidity

– molecular mimicry

– molecular structure
  – amino acid sequence
  – amino acid motifs
  – f-box motifs
  – catalytic domain
  – exteins
  – histone code
  – immunoglobulin variable region
  – complementarity determining regions
  – inteins
  – peptide library
  – protein sorting signals
  – nuclear export signals
  – nuclear localization signals
  – repetitive sequences, amino acid
  – ankyrin repeat
  – base sequence
  – at rich sequence
  – gc rich sequence
  – cpg islands
  – matrix attachment regions
  – regulatory sequences, nucleic acid
  – enhancer elements (genetics)
  – e-box elements
  – hiv enhancer
  – response elements
  – serum response element
  – vitamin d response element
  – insulator elements
  – locus control region
  – operator regions (genetics)
  – promoter regions (genetics)
  – response elements
  – serum response element
  – vitamin d response element
  – TATA box
  – regulatory sequences, ribonucleic acid
  – rna 3' polyadenylation signals
  – rna splice sites
  – rna 5' terminal oligopyrimidine sequence
  – silencer elements, transcriptional
  – terminator regions (genetics)
  – repetitive sequences, nucleic acid
  – interspersed repetitive sequences
  – dna transposable elements
  – integrons
  – genomic islands
  – retroelements
  – endogenous retroviruses
  – genes, intracisternal a-particle
  – long interspersed nucleotide elements
  – short interspersed nucleotide elements
  – alu elements
  – tandem repeat sequences
  – dna repeat expansion
  – trinucleotide repeat expansion
  – dna, satellite
  – microsatellite repeats
  – dinucleotide repeats
  – trinucleotide repeats
  – trinucleotide repeat expansion
  – minisatellite repeats
  – terminal repeat sequences
  – hiv long terminal repeat
  – hiv enhancer
  – carbohydrate sequence
  – conserved sequence
  – consensus sequence
  – molecular conformation
  – carbohydrate conformation
  – nucleic acid conformation
  – base pairing
  – protein conformation
  – protein structure, quaternary
  – protein structure, secondary
  – amino acid motifs
  – ankyrin repeat
  – at-hook motifs
  – cystine knot motifs
  – f-box motifs
  – helix-loop-helix motifs
  – ef hand motifs
  – helix-turn-helix motifs
  – leucine zippers
  – zinc fingers
  – protein structure, tertiary
  – hmg-box domains
  – kringles
  – src homology domains
  – structural homology, protein

– nitrogen fixation

– nitrosation

– nucleic acid denaturation

– nucleic acid hybridization

– nucleic acid renaturation

– osmosis

– protein binding

– protein denaturation

– protein folding

– protein hybridization

– protein renaturation

– rna stability

– sequence homology
  – sequence homology, amino acid
  – structural homology, protein
  – sequence homology, nucleic acid
  – synteny

– signal transduction
  – ion channel gating
  – map kinase signaling system
  – mechanotransduction, cellular
  – phototransduction
  – second messenger systems
  – calcium signaling
  – synaptic transmission

– structure-activity relationship
  – quantitative structure-activity relationship

– substrate specificity

– up-regulation

– virus replication
  – virus assembly

– water-electrolyte balance
  – kallikrein-kinin system
  – water loss, insensible

– metabolism

– absorption
  – intestinal absorption
  – skin absorption

– acylation
  – acetylation
  – aminoacylation
  – transfer rna aminoacylation

– alkylation
  – methylation
  – dna methylation

– amination

– biological transport
  – biological transport, active
  – active transport, cell nucleus
  – membrane potentials
  – capillary permeability
  – cell membrane permeability
  – cytoplasmic streaming
  – axonal transport
  – ion transport
  – calcium signaling
  – protein transport
  – active transport, cell nucleus
  – respiratory transport
  – pulmonary gas exchange
  – rna transport

– biotinylation

– carbohydrate metabolism
  – fermentation
  – gluconeogenesis
  – glycogenolysis
  – glycolysis
  – pentose phosphate pathway

– cyclization

– dealkylation

– deamination

– decarboxylation

– dimerization

– electron transport

– energy metabolism
  – basal metabolism
  – citric acid cycle
  – glycolysis
  – oxidation-reduction
  – electron transport
  – lipid peroxidation
  – oxidative phosphorylation
  – pentose phosphate pathway
  – photosynthesis
  – photophosphorylation
  – proton-motive force
  – substrate cycling

– enterohepatic circulation

– enzyme activation

– esterification

– glycosylation

– hydrogenation

– hydrolysis

– hydroxylation

– kallikrein-kinin system

– lipid metabolism
  – lipogenesis
  – lipolysis
  – lipid mobilization

– nitrogen fixation

– nitrosation

– oxidative stress
  – protein carbonylation

– oxygen consumption
  – anaerobic threshold
  – respiratory burst

– peptide biosynthesis
  – aminoacylation
  – transfer rna aminoacylation
  – peptide biosynthesis, nucleic acid-independent
  – protein biosynthesis
  – frameshifting, ribosomal
  – peptide chain elongation, translational
  – peptide chain initiation, translational
  – peptide chain termination, translational
  – protein modification, translational
  – protein processing, post-translational
  – protein isoprenylation
  – protein splicing
  – transfer rna aminoacylation

– pharmacokinetics
  – area under curve
  – biological availability
  – biotransformation
  – metabolic clearance rate
  – metabolic detoxication, drug
  – metabolic detoxication, phase i
  – metabolic detoxication, phase ii
  – therapeutic equivalency
  – tissue distribution

– phosphorylation
  – oxidative phosphorylation
  – photophosphorylation

– protein binding

– renin–angiotensin system

– rna processing, post-transcriptional
  – rna 3' end processing
  – polyadenylation
  – rna editing
  – rna splicing
  – alternative splicing
  – trans-splicing

– secretory rate

– substrate cycling

– tissue distribution

– nutrition

– animal nutrition

– child nutrition
  – adolescent nutrition
  – infant nutrition
  – bottle feeding
  – breast feeding
  – weaning

– diet
  – diet, mediterranean
  – diet, vegetarian
  – diet, macrobiotic
  – energy intake
  – caloric restriction

– maternal nutrition
  – prenatal nutrition

– nutritional requirements

– nutritional status

– nutritive value
  – glycemic index

The list continues at List of MeSH codes (G07).

G06